Don Alfonso Fadrique (died 1338) was the eldest and illegitimate son of Frederick II of Sicily. He served as vicar general of the Duchy of Athens from 1317 to 1330.

He was first proclaimed vicar general by his father in 1317 and sent off to govern Athens on behalf of his younger half-brother Manfred. He arrived in Piraeus with ten galleys later that year, but Manfred had died and was succeeded by another brother, William II. In the year of his arrival, Fadrique married Marulla, the daughter of Boniface of Verona, thus allying himself with the chief lord of Euboea. By this marriage, also, he acquired rights to the castles of Larmena, Karystos, Zetouni, and Gardiki.

Over the next two years, Fadrique warred with the Republic of Venice and stormed the city of Negroponte with Turks after Boniface of Verona died. In 1318, John II Ducas, the sebastokrator of Neopatras, died and Fadrique invaded Thessaly. He took possession of his castles at Zetouni and Gardiki and conquered Neopatras, Siderokastron, Loidoriki, Domokos, and Pharsalus. He conquered the palace of the Ducae at Neopatras and took the title of Vicar General of the Duchy of Neopatras. He built a tower at Neopatras.

In 1330, Alfonso was relieved of his duties as vicar general and replaced by Odo de Novelles. He was compensated with the Sicilian  counties of Malta and Gozo. He died in 1338 and left five sons, Peter; James, father of Louis Fadrique; William, lord of Livadeia; Boniface, lord of Aigina, Piada and Karystos; John, lord of Salamina and two daughters, Simona, who wed George II Ghisi and Jua.

References

Sources

  
Setton, Kenneth M. Catalan Domination of Athens 1311–1380. Revised edition. Variorum: London, 1975.

1294 births
1338 deaths
Vicars-General of the Duchy of Athens
Alfonso
14th-century rulers in Europe
Alfonso
Alfonso
Alfonso
Counts of Malta
Illegitimate children of monarchs